Helvecia Viera (1928 – March 29, 2009) was a Chilean actress and comedian. Viera appeared in Chilean television and theater productions throughout her career, which spanned over three decades. Viera died following a series of strokes at the Hospital Sótero del Río in Santiago, Chile, on March 29, 2009, at the age of 80.

Television credits 
Her television credits included Morandé con compañía and Sábados Gigantes. Her other notable roles include Versus (2005), Don Floro (2004) and Jappening con Ja (1978).

References

External links

 Terra: Funeral de Helvecia Viera se Realizara Este Martes eb el Cementario General

1928 births
2009 deaths
Chilean telenovela actresses
Chilean television actresses
Chilean women comedians
20th-century comedians